The men's 50 metre butterfly event at the 2010 Asian Games took place on 16 November 2010 at Guangzhou Aoti Aquatics Centre.

There were 33 competitors from 23 countries who took part in this event. Five heats were held, with most containing the maximum number of swimmers (eight). The heat in which a swimmer competed did not formally matter for advancement, as the swimmers with the top eight times from the entire field qualified for the finals.

Zhou Jiawei from China won the gold medal, Masayuki Kishida from Japan finished with second place, Virdhawal Khade from India won the bronze medal, it's the only swimming medal for India in the 2010 Asian games.

Schedule
All times are China Standard Time (UTC+08:00)

Records

Results

Heats

Swim-off

Final

References
 16th Asian Games Results

External links 
 Men's 50m Butterfly Heats Official Website
 Men's 50m Butterfly Ev.No.20 Heats Swim-off 1 Official Website
 Men's 50m Butterfly Ev.No.20 Final Official Website

Swimming at the 2010 Asian Games